Mykhailo Leontiyovych Bondar (born 17 November 1973) is a Ukrainian former National Guard volunteer and politician currently serving as a People's Deputy of Ukraine from Ukraine's 119th electoral district since 27 November 2014.

Early life and career 
From 1992 to 1994, he served in the Armed Forces of Ukraine. From 1997 to 1998, he served as accounting in the Zhvyrka village council, before working in accounting in the Sokal Raion telecommunications unit of Lviv ODPEZ Ukrtelekom. In 1999, he worked in the Sokal Raion section of the Lviv chapter of the company Gas Ukraine.

From 1997 to 2006, Bondar studied at University of Lviv, graduating with a specialisation in Finance, Economics, and Entrepreneurship.

War in Donbas 
Following the beginning of the Russo-Ukrainian War, Bondar volunteered to join the National Guard of Ukraine. He participated in the Battle of Debaltseve and the Siege of Sloviansk, being wounded at the latter.

People's Deputy of Ukraine 
Bondar participated in the 2014 Ukrainian parliamentary election as the candidate of the People's Front as People's Deputy of Ukraine from Ukraine's 119th electoral district. He won the elections with 26.36% of the vote; incumbent People's Deputy Iryna Sekh of Svoboda won only 13.60%, placing fourth. Following his election, Bondar sat as an independent, and was head of the coal subcommittee of the Verkhovna Rada Committee on the Fuel-Energy Complex, Nuclear Policy, and Nuclear Security.

Bondar was re-elected in the 2019 Ukrainian parliamentary election, this time as the candidate of European Solidarity. He won with a margin of 139 votes above the next-closest candidate, Orest Kavetskyi of Servant of the People. He is a member of the European Solidarity faction in the Verkhovna Rada, as well as the Committee on Energy and Housing-Communal Services.

References 

1973 births
Living people
Eighth convocation members of the Verkhovna Rada
Ninth convocation members of the Verkhovna Rada
People from Lviv Oblast
Ukrainian military personnel of the war in Donbas
University of Lviv alumni